Upton is a municipality in the Regional County Municipality of Acton, in the province of Quebec, Canada. The population as of the Canada 2011 Census was 2,075.

Demographics

Population
Population trend:

(+) Amalgamation of the Parish of Saint-Éphrem-d’Upton and the Village of Upton on February 25, 1998.

Language
Mother tongue language (2006)

See also
List of municipalities in Quebec
Municipal history of Quebec

References

External links

Municipal Region of Acton's Upton Page

Municipalities in Quebec
Incorporated places in Acton Regional County Municipality
Designated places in Quebec